The Period Products (Free Provision) (Scotland) Act 2021 was enacted in November 2020 by the Scottish Government, and received Royal assent on 12 January 2021. It is the world's first legislation to make it mandatory for all public institutions to provide free sanitary products for menstruation including tampons and pads. The act followed a campaign coordinated by Monica Lennon, MSP, the spokesperson on health for the Scottish Labour party, and obtained all-party support in the Scottish Parliament. The provision will cost an estimated £8.7 million annually.

History
The campaign for free period products had been led by Scotland. In 2017 the country's first minister had announced that period products would be free in Scotland's schools. It has been noted that other public toilets have followed the lead offering free products or free with an "honesty box". Similar schemes for schools have been promised for Ireland in 2020. The Scottish government had originally proposed that free products should be available on a means tested basis but changed its proposals in February given the wide support in the Scottish parliament.

The legislation came into force on 15 August 2022, making Scotland the first country to make such a provision.

References 

Menstrual cycle
Acts of the Scottish Parliament 2020